A sphere is a three-dimensional object shaped like a ball; it may also refer to a sphere-like region or shell.

Sphere may also refer to:

Astronomy
 Armillary sphere, a physical model of the celestial sphere
 Celestial sphere, the astronomical description of the sky
 Celestial spheres or planetary spheres, refer to a geocentric model of the universe and the associated postulate of a "Musica Universalis" (Music of the Spheres)
 Hill sphere, the spherical region around an astronomical body where the primary gravitational influence on an orbiting object is that body
 Spectro-Polarimetric High-Contrast Exoplanet Research (SPHERE) is an adaptive optics system and coronagraphic facility at the Very Large Telescope (VLT)
 Sphere of influence (astrodynamics), similar to the Hill sphere, but smaller, only about 60% of the radius
 Sphere of influence (black hole), a region around a supermassive black hole
 SPHERES (Synchronized Position Hold, Engage, Reorient Experimental Satellites), a formation flight testbed developed by MIT's Space Systems Laboratory
 SPHEREx (Spectro-Photometer for the History of the Universe, Epoch of Reionization, and Ices Explorer), a proposed space telescope

Human sciences
 Public sphere, an area where individuals can discuss social problems
 Sphere of influence, a metaphorical region of influence surrounding a country, person or concept

Mathematics
 n-sphere, the set of points at fixed distance from a central point in n+1 dimensional space
 Spherical surface, the boundary of a sphere (also known simply as sphere in mathematics)
 Spherical volume, the region inside a sphere (also known as a ball in mathematics)
 Unit sphere, the set of points at a distance of 1 from a central point

Arts, entertainment, and media

Films
 Sphere (1998 film), a film based on Crichton's 1987 novel, starring Dustin Hoffman, Sharon Stone, and Samuel L. Jackson
 Sphere (2013 film), an animated short film

Literature
 Sphere (novel), a 1987 science-fiction novel by Michael Crichton
 De sphaera mundi (The Sphere), a medieval astronomy book by Johannes de Sacrobosco
 The Sphere (newspaper), a British weekly newspaper which ran between 1900 and 1964

Music

Groups
 Sphere (American band), American jazz ensemble
 Sphere (Japanese band), a Japanese pop idol unit
 Sphere (Polish band), a death metal band from Poland
 Sphere3, a Progressive Rock/Jazz Fusion band

Albums and songs
 Sphere (album), a 2005 album by noise music artist Merzbow
 "Sphere", a song by John Frusciante and Josh Klinghoffer from their album A Sphere in the Heart of Silence (2004)
 Spheres (Delerium album)
 "Spheres" (instrumental), a 2007 single by Mike Oldfield
 Spheres (Pestilence album), 1993
 Spheres, an album by Daniel Hope
 Spheres 2, a 1994 album by Delerium

Other uses in arts, entertainment, and media
 Sphere, an extraterrestrial artificial intelligence that allies with humans from Independence Day: Resurgence
 Spheres (TV series), a Korean animation
 The Sphere, a 1971 large metallic sculpture located between the twin towers of the former World Trade Center, it was damaged and temporarily moved to another place
 Silver Sphere (born 1999), American singer-songwriter
The Spheres, a fictional planetary system in Colplay's album Music of the Spheres

Other uses
Sphere (organization), a project launched in 1997 to develop a set of minimum standards in core areas of humanitarian assistance
 Sphere (website), a blog search engine
Sphere, a rumored internal development name for the PlayStation Move controller
 Astigmatism disambiguation, in optometry, a parameter in eyeglass prescriptions that gives the optical power of the lens
 Sphere 1 - one of the earliest personal computers
 Sphere Books, a British paperback-publisher from the 1960s to the 1980s and the 2000s to today
 The Sphere (social network), an online network for renting luxury properties

See also
 Sfera (disambiguation)
 Sphering (disambiguation)